Billy Brown is an American actor. In 2014, he began starring as Detective Nate Lahey in the Shonda Rhimes drama series How to Get Away with Murder. He is also known for his roles in the television series Lights Out, Dexter, Sons of Anarchy and Hostages.

Life and career
Brown was born and raised in Inglewood, California. He is known for his role as detective Mike Anderson on Showtime's Dexter from 2011 to 2012. Previously he starred as boxer Richard "Death Row" Reynolds in the short-lived FX series Lights Out. In 2012, he landed the recurring role of August Marks in the fifth and sixth season of Sons of Anarchy. He also provided the second voice of Cliffjumper in the animated series Transformers: Prime. In 2013, he portrayed Agent Troy Riley in the first season of The Following.

Brown starred opposite Toni Collette in the CBS drama series Hostages from 2013-14. In 2014, he was cast opposite Viola Davis in ABC drama How to Get Away with Murder, produced by Shonda Rhimes.

In 2018, Brown was cast in his first film leading role in the Screen Gems' thriller Proud Mary opposite Taraji P. Henson.

Brown also voices recruiting commercials for the United States Marine Corps.

Filmography

Film

Television

Video games

Awards and nominations

References

External links 

American male television actors
American male voice actors
Living people
Male actors from Inglewood, California
20th-century American male actors
21st-century American male actors
Year of birth missing (living people)